Dr. Tinsley Lindley OBE (27 October 1865 – 31 March 1940) was an English footballer. He was described as "an ideal centre forward". He scored three goals in his debut aged 16 for Nottingham Forest. He was an amateur who did not wear football boots but scored 14 goals for England in 13 internationals Lindley was given an O.B.E. in January 1918 for his work during World War I and in 1935 he was also awarded the King George V Silver Jubilee Medal. On retirement from football, Lindley turned his attention to his law practice, having been called to the Bar in 1899 while still playing.

Early life
Lindley was the third son of Leonard Lindley who was a lace dresser and Mayor of Nottingham in 1882. The family lived in Clipstone Avenue, Nottingham and Lindley attended Nottingham High School between 1875 and 1883, where he first revealed his talent. His older brother, Leonard, was also a talented footballer and cricketer.

He later attended The Leys School in Cambridge, where he turned to rugby. From 1885 to 1888 he studied at Caius College, Cambridge and during this time played football for Cambridge University, and also for the Corinthians and Casuals. Lindley obtained not just a degree but he also achieved a Master of Law and LL.D law doctorate.

Club career
In 1888, Lindley returned to his home town to join Nottingham Forest. He was the youngest ever Nottingham Forest player and at age 16 he scored three goals on his debut on 17 February 1882. In one season, he scored 85 goals for Forest. During the 1889–90 season also played three matches for Nottingham rivals Notts County. Lindley was drafted in as cover for James Oswald in a match against Aston Villa. Villa were unhappy as he was not registered, they appealed and Notts were fined £5. Lindley appealed but the fine was increased to £30 and Notts were deducted two points.

In 1891 he also played for Crusaders and Swifts for a short while before guest-playing for Preston North End in a 4–1 defeat at Sunderland in 1892.

His many transfers were due primarily to his professional full-time career and the fact that he always remained an amateur, although many clubs wanted to hire him as a professional. He was the epitome of the 'Corinthian gentleman amateur' of his time, being an academic as well as a sportsman. He refused to wear ordinary football boots when playing, preferring walking brogues instead, declaring that boots marred his great sprinting speed.

International career
His England call-up came on 13 March 1886 when, along with his Nottingham Forest teammate Teddy Leighton, he was one of eight new caps selected to play against Ireland at Ballynafeigh Park, Belfast. Lindley scored as England "totally dominated" the match with Benjamin Spilsbury scoring four goals in a 6–1 victory.

It has been claimed that he holds the record for scoring in nine consecutive England matches between 13 March 1886 and 7 April 1888. However, there is no substance whatsoever to this claim, as this includes the match against Wales on 29 March 1886, in which all contemporary reports credit the goals to George Brann, Fred Dewhurst and Andrew Amos. He did, however, score in each of the next 6 consecutive games, which is still an England record (though note that Steve Bloomer scored in ten consecutive matches in which he played, and George Camsell in nine). In total he scored 14 international goals in just 13 games. He held the overall England goalscoring record from March 1888 when he equalled Charles Bambridge's tally of 11 until his final tally of 14 was overhauled by Steve Bloomer in 1898.

First-class cricket
Lindley played first-class cricket for Cambridge University and Nottinghamshire. He played ten games between 1885 and 1893 taking nearly a wicket a match as a round-arm right-armed slow to medium bowler. Lindley also averaged about ten runs per innings as a right-handed batsman.

Retirement from playing
On retirement from football, Lindley turned his full attention to his law practice, having been called to the Bar in 1899 while still playing. He also lectured in law at University of Nottingham and served as a County Court Judge on the Midland Circuit. Lindley also stayed loyal to Nottingham Forest, serving on the committee for several years. Lindley was also a President and Vice-President for local Amateur side Nottinghamshire FC who were formed in 1895. During World War I, Lindley served as the Chief Officer of the Nottingham Special Constabulary and as Deputy Director of the Nottinghamshire Territorial Association. He was awarded the OBE in 1918 for these services. He lived at 14 Park Terrace in Nottingham. He died in Nottingham on 31 March 1940 aged 74.

In October 2013 a campaign was launched to raise £6,000 to provide a headstone on Lindley's grave in the Wilford Hill Cemetery near Nottingham. For an unknown reason, Lindley had been buried in an unmarked grave. As of 11 March 2014 £5850 had been raised. The memorial was unveiled on 31 March 2014.

References

External links

CricInfo profile

1865 births
1940 deaths
People educated at Nottingham High School
People educated at The Leys School
Alumni of Gonville and Caius College, Cambridge
Academics of the University of Nottingham
Officers of the Order of the British Empire
English footballers
England international footballers
Cambridge University A.F.C. players
Casuals F.C. players
Corinthian F.C. players
Crusaders F.C. (London) players
Swifts F.C. players
Nottingham Forest F.C. players
Notts County F.C. players
Preston North End F.C. players
English cricketers
Cambridge University cricketers
Nottinghamshire cricketers
English barristers
20th-century English judges
Oxford and Cambridge Universities cricketers
Association football forwards
Footballers from Nottingham
Cricketers from Nottingham
County Court judges (England and Wales)